Garki is a Local Government Area of Jigawa State, Nigeria. Its headquarters are in the town of Garki. It is also called Garkin Dirani, the name of the head of the district.

It has an area of 1,408 km2 and had a population of 152,233 at the 2006 census.

The postal code of the area is 733.

Garki was the site of the Garki Project, a multidisciplinary study performed by the World Health Organization from 1969 to 1976 into the effectiveness of malaria intervention techniques.

References

Local Government Areas in Jigawa State